, born , was the wife and adviser of Emperor Meiji of Japan. She is also known under the technically incorrect name . She was one of the founders of the Japanese Red Cross Society, whose charity work was known throughout the First Sino-Japanese War.

Early life

Lady Masako Ichijō was born on 9 May 1849, in Heian-kyō, Japan. She was the third daughter of Tadayoshi Ichijō, former Minister of the Left and head of the Fujiwara clan's Ichijō branch. Her adoptive mother was one of Prince Fushimi Kuniie's daughters, but her biological mother was Tamiko Niihata, the daughter of a doctor from the Ichijō family. Unusually for the time, she had been vaccinated against smallpox. As a child, Masako was somewhat of a prodigy: she was able to read poetry from the Kokin Wakashū by the age of 4 and had composed some waka verses of her own by the age of 5. By age seven, she was able to read some texts in classical Chinese with some assistance and was studying Japanese calligraphy. By the age of 12, she had studied the koto and was fond of Noh drama. She excelled in the studies of finances, ikebana and Japanese tea ceremony.

The major obstacle to Lady Masako's eligibility to become empress consort was the fact that she was 3 years older than Emperor Meiji, but this issue was resolved by changing her official birth date from 1849 to 1850. They became engaged on 2 September 1867, when she adopted the given name , which was intended to reflect her 
serene beauty and diminutive size.
The Tokugawa Bakufu promised 15,000 ryō in gold for the wedding and assigned her an annual income of 500 koku, but as the Meiji Restoration occurred before the wedding could be completed, the promised amounts were never delivered. The wedding was delayed partly due to periods of mourning for Emperor Kōmei,  for her brother Saneyoshi, and the political disturbances around Kyoto between 1867 and 1868.

Empress of Japan

Lady Haruko and Emperor Meiji's wedding was finally officially celebrated on 11 January 1869. She was the first imperial consort to receive the title of both nyōgō and of kōgō (literally, the emperor's wife, translated as "empress consort"), in several hundred years. However, it soon became clear that she was unable to bear children. Emperor Meiji already had 12 children by 5 concubines, though: as custom in Japanese monarchy, Empress Haruko adopted Yoshihito, her husband's eldest son by Lady Yanagihara Naruko, who became Crown Prince. On 8 November 1869, the Imperial House departed from Kyoto for the new capital of Tokyo. In a break from tradition, Emperor Meiji insisted that the Empress and the senior ladies-in-waiting should attend the educational lectures given to the Emperor on a regular basis about national conditions and developments in foreign nations.

Influence
On 30 July 1886, Empress Haruko attended the Peeresses School's graduation ceremony in Western clothing. On 10 August, the imperial couple received foreign guests in Western clothing for the first time when hosting a Western Music concert.

From this point onward, the Empress' entourage wore only Western-style clothes in public, to the point that in January 1887 
Empress Haruko issued a memorandum on the subject: traditional Japanese dress was not only unsuited to modern life, but Western-style dress was closer than the kimono to clothes worn by Japanese women in ancient times.

In the diplomatic field, Empress Haruko hosted the wife of former US President Ulysses S. Grant during his visit to Japan. She was also present for her husband's meetings with Hawaiian King Kalākaua in 1881. Later that same year, she helped host the visit of the sons of future British King Edward VII: Princes Albert Victor and George (future George V), who presented her with a pair of pet wallabies from Australia.

On  26 November 1886, Empress Haruko accompanied her husband to Yokosuka, Kanagawa to observe the new Imperial Japanese Navy cruisers Naniwa and Takachiho firing torpedoes and performing other maneuvers. From 1887, the Empress was often at the Emperor's side in official visits to army maneuvers. When Emperor Meiji fell ill in 1888, Empress Haruko took his place in welcoming envoys from Siam, launching warships and visiting Tokyo Imperial University. In 1889, Empress Haruko accompanied Emperor Meiji on his official visit to Nagoya and Kyoto. While he continued on to visit naval bases at Kure and Sasebo, she went to Nara to worship at the principal Shinto shrines.

Known throughout her reign for her support of charity work and women's education during the First Sino-Japanese War (1894–95), Empress Haruko worked for the establishment of the Japanese Red Cross Society. She participated in the organization's administration, especially in their peacetime activities in which she created a money fund for the International Red Cross. Renamed "The Empress Shōken Fund", it is presently used for international welfare activities. After Emperor Meiji moved his military headquarters from Tokyo to Hiroshima to be closer to the lines of communications with his troops, Empress Haruko joined her husband in March 1895. While in Hiroshima, she insisted on visiting hospitals full of wounded soldiers every other day of her stay.

Death
After Emperor Meiji's death in 1912, Empress Haruko was granted the title  by her adoptive son, Emperor Taishō. She died in 1914 at the Imperial Villa in Numazu, Shizuoka and was buried in the East Mound of the Fushimi Momoyama Ryo in Fushimi, Kyoto, next to her husband. Her soul was enshrined in Meiji Shrine in Tokyo. On 9 May 1914, she received the posthumous name Shōken Kōtaigō (昭憲皇太后). Her railway-carriage can be seen today in the Meiji Mura Museum, in Inuyama, Aichi prefecture.

Honours

National
 Grand Cordon of the Order of the Precious Crown, 1 November 1888

Foreign
She received the following orders and decorations:
 : Grand Cross of the Order of St. Catherine, 13 December 1887
 : Dame of the Order of Queen Maria Luisa, 29 November 1889
 : Dame of the Order of the Royal House of Chakri, 12 October 1899
 : Dame of the Order of Louise, 1st Class, 19 May 1903
 : Dame of Honour of the Order of Theresa, 29 February 1904
 : Grand Cordon of the Order of the Auspicious Phoenix, 27 July 1908

Ancestry

See also
 Empress of Japan
 Ōmiya Palace

Notes

References
 Fujitani, Takashi. (1998). Splendid Monarchy: Power and Pageantry in Modern Japan.. Berkeley: University of California Press. ; —Reprint edition, 1998. 
 Hoyt, Edwin P. (1992). Hirohito: The Emperor and the Man. New York: Praeger Publishers. ; 
 Keene, Donald. (2002). Emperor Of Japan: Meiji And His World, 1852-1912. New York: Columbia University Press. ; 
 Lebra, Sugiyama Takie. (1996). Above the Clouds: Status Culture of the Modern Japanese Nobility. Berkeley: University of California Press. ;

External links

The Empress Shoken Fund

1849 births
1914 deaths
People from Kyoto
Japanese empresses
People of Meiji-period Japan
Emperor Meiji
Ichijō family
Japanese philanthropists
19th-century Japanese women

Grand Cordons (Imperial Family) of the Order of the Precious Crown